Chlorine pentafluoride is an interhalogen compound with formula ClF5.  This colourless gas is a strong oxidant that was once a candidate oxidizer for rockets.  The molecule adopts a square pyramidal structure with C4v symmetry, as confirmed by its high-resolution 19F NMR spectrum. It was first synthesized in 1963.

Preparation
Some of the earliest research on the preparation was classified. It was first prepared by fluorination of chlorine trifluoride at high temperatures and high pressures:
ClF3  +  F2   →   ClF5
ClF  +  2F2   →   ClF5
Cl2  +  5F2   →   2ClF5
CsClF4  +  F2   →   CsF  +  ClF5
NiF2 catalyzes this reaction.

Certain metal fluorides, MClF4 (i.e. KClF4, RbClF4, CsClF4), react with F2 to produce ClF5 and the corresponding alkali metal fluoride.

Reactions
In a highly exothermic reaction, ClF5 reacts with water to produce chloryl fluoride and hydrogen fluoride:
 + 2  →  + 4 

It is also a strong fluorinating agent. At room temperature it reacts readily with all elements (including otherwise "inert" elements like platinum and gold) except noble gases, nitrogen, oxygen and fluorine.

Uses

Rocket propellant 
Chlorine pentafluoride was once considered for use as an oxidizer for rockets. As a propellant, it has a higher maximum specific impulse than ClF3, but with the same difficulties in handling. Due to the hazardous nature of chlorine pentafluoride, it has yet to be used in a large scale rocket propulsion system. John Drury Clark summarized the difficulties of handling ClF3:

It is, of course, extremely toxic, but that's the least of the problem. It is hypergolic with every known fuel, and so rapidly hypergolic that no ignition delay has ever been measured. It is also hypergolic with such things as cloth, wood, and test engineers, not to mention asbestos, sand, and water—with which it reacts explosively. It can be kept in some of the ordinary structural metals—steel, copper, aluminum, etc.—because of the formation of a thin film of insoluble metal fluoride that protects the bulk of the metal, just as the invisible coat of oxide on aluminum keeps it from burning up in the atmosphere. If, however, this coat is melted or scrubbed off, and has no chance to reform, the operator is confronted with the problem of coping with a metal-fluorine fire. For dealing with this situation, I have always recommended a good pair of running shoes.

See also
 Chlorine trifluoride
 Hypervalent molecule

References

External links
National Pollutant Inventory - Fluoride and compounds fact sheet
New Jersey Hazardous Substance Fact Sheet
WebBook page for ClF5

Fluorides
Inorganic chlorine compounds
Interhalogen compounds
Rocket oxidizers
Fluorinating agents
Oxidizing agents
Chlorine(V) compounds
Substances discovered in the 1960s